Jeyran (born Khadijeh Khanum Tajrishi, 1831–1860) was one of the beloved wives and first mistress of Naser al-Din Shah Qajar (1848–1896). 

Known for her beauty and charm, Jeyran was born as Khadijeh, daughter of Mohammad Ali, a gardener and carpenter. She met Naser al-Din Shah circa 1850 and married him in 1851. She was given title of Forough al-Saltanah. Jeyran spread her influence by the birth of her second child, Mohammad Qasem Mirza and who was made commander-in-chief. Although he had no maternal Qajar ancestor, with a fake lineage made for Jeyran which linked her to Sasanids and Ilkhanate, he became crown prince, but shortly got sick and died. Afterwards, Jeyran lost all of her children and got tuberculosis. She died in 1860. Her death had an impact on Naser al-Din Shah, who abandoned the royal responsibilities for a while.

Early life 
Jeyran was born in 1831 in Tajrish village near Tehran. Named "Khadijeh", she was the daughter of Mohammad Ali, a gardener and carpenter. As well as a sister, Jeyran had a brother named Asadollah, who after her marriage to the Shah became a servant and later a special adviser to Nasser al-Din Shah.

Meeting Naser al-Din Shah 

There are different opinions about how Naser al-Din Shah and Jeyran became acquainted. According to the modern historian Abbas Amanat, Jeyran was first brought to the royal palace to learn singing and dancing, and for the first time Naser al-Din Shah saw her among the servants of his mother, Malek Jahan Khanom, and fell in love with her.

In his memoirs, Taghi Khan Daneshvar (Alam ol-Soltan), the Shah's personal violinist, attributed their acquaintance to one of the Shah's hunting trips to the north of Tehran. He wrote that Naser al-Din Shah was fascinated by her courage and beauty.

In his book, From Forough Al-Dawlah to Anisa Al-Dawlah, Khosrow Motazed says the young Naser al-Din Shah met Jeyran during one of his trips to Shemiran, the Qajar kings' resort. According to him, at their first meeting Jeyran did not recognize the Shah, and while sitting on a mulberry tree and eating berries, she disregarded the Shah, considering him an annoying stranger, speaking with pride and arrogance:

Mones ol-Dowleh (court lady of Anis ol-Dowleh) in her memoirs, also considers that Jeyran met the Shah on one of his travels and tells a similar story. According to her, the Shah, who had met a group of girls under a berry tree during his outing, including Jeyran, was seduced by her black eyes and sent his eunuchs to ask her name and find her father. Then he proposed to her and Jeyran answered in the affirmative.

Regardless of which quote is more authoritative, the important point is that the meeting between Naser al-Din Shah and Jeyran was a chance encounter. Jeyran was a rural girl from one of the deprived classes of society. Naser al-Din Shah, despite having other women, experienced love with Jeyran for the first time, and his love for her gradually reached the level of insanity; so that he could not bear the moments of distance of his mistress.

Forough al-Saltanah 

In 1851, Nasser al-Din Shah married Jeyran and gave her title of Forough ol-Saltaneh. In the ceremony that was organized on the occasion of this marriage, Malek Jahan Khanom, the mother of Nasser al-Din Shah, was not present, which was a sign of her opposition and enmity with Jeyran. One year after Jeyran married Naser al-Din Shah, her first child, Soltan Mohammad Mirza, was born and died eight days later. Then her second child, Mohammad Qasem Mirza, was born, and from that day on, the Shah paid more attention to her. When Mohammad Qasem Mirza was five years old, the Shah gave him the title of "Amir Nezam" and appointed him commander-in-chief of the army.

After the death of Naser al-Din Shah's second crown prince, Soltan Moin ed-Din Mirza, son of Taj ol-Dowleh, in October 1856, Naser al-Din Shah decided to appoint Mohammad Qasem as crown prince. But Jeyran's non-Qajar lineage prevented this decision from being implemented, as it was the tradition that the Qajar kings be of their tribe ancestry in both paternal and maternal lines. Aware of her position, Jeyran tried to put pressure on Mirza Aqa Khan Nuri. She collaborated with some courtiers opposed to Nuri, including Mirza Yusuf Ashtiani and Aziz Khan Mokri. In June 1857, they compiled a list of the crimes of Mirza Aqa Khan, and Jeyran presented the list of crimes to the Shah. After this incident, Nuri invited Jeyran to his garden, Nizamieh, and promised her to do his best for Mohammad Qasem to become the crown prince. With Nuri's support for Jeyran, Malek Jahan Khanom, who was a serious opponent of Jeyran and Mohammad Qasem, turned against Mirza Aqa Khan.

Mirza Aqa Khan entered into negotiations with the representatives of the Russian and British governments to persuade them to support Mohammad Qasem Mirza as crown prince. He also asked Jakob Eduard Polak, a court physician, to confirm that Mozaffar al-Din Mirza, who was considered a legal choice for crown prince, was physically and mentally weak and didn't deserve to ascend to be king. The preparation of a fake lineage that linked Jeyran's lineage to the Ilkhanate and Sassanid kings was another step in legitimizing Crown Prince Mohammad Qasem Mirza. 

Finally, in September 1857, Mohammad Qasem was officially proclaimed crown prince. Shortly afterwards, Mohammad Qasem Mirza became ill, and the opposition made it known that Mirza Aqa Khan had poisoned the crown prince, making Jeyran and Shah suspicious of Mirza Aqa Khan again. Concerned about his opponents' conspiracies, Jeyran refused to admit doctors to his son's bedside, and Mohammad Qasem Mirza died just one week after becoming crown prince. Naser al-Din Shah and Jeyran were so moved by the incident that, according to Polak, "the king did not eat for several days out of grief."

Death 
Jeyran contracted tuberculosis after losing all four of her children in childhood, one after the other. Naser al-Din Shah went to her bed several times a day for several hours and administered the medicine with his own hands, but her condition gradually got worse and the medical treatment did not help. Jeyran died in January 1860 with Naser al-Din Shah at her bedside.

Appearance and skills 
Jeyran has been described as beautiful, straightforward and fascinated by hunting and horseback riding. She wore men's boots and clothes while riding, wrapped her veil around her head, and agilely rode horses. She had a chestnut horse, "Ahoo", which she rode with into the mountains and was interested in falconry, as she flied her royal falcon "Ghazal" after partridges. At these times a large group of archers, warriors and servants would be gathered around her, so that if anyone saw this scene they would think it was a royal hunting party. After she married Naser al-Din Shah, she was named "Jeyran" (meaning gazelle) by the Shah because of her big eyes. 

Jeyran's fascination with hunting and bold behavior, unlike the usual veiled harem women, attracted the king's attention more and more. According to Abbas Amanat, "the Shah's attachment to Jeyran was the routine of ordinary love in the modern age and, conversely, the collective life of the harem was individual and private."

Legacy 
Naser al-Din Shah lived for thirty years after Jeyran's death and, according to many sources, did not forget her for the rest of his life. According to Dost Ali Moayeri, the Shah never gave the title of Jeyran and did not allow anyone to live in her mansion. Sometimes he would go to his wife's former residence alone and spend some time thinking about the past and seeing Jeyran's relics. Naser al-Din Shah wanted to be buried next to Jeyran, and after his assassination in 1896, he was buried next to her.

In the popular culture of the Iranian people, Jeyran and Naser al-Din Shah were introduced as a symbol of love and are often compared to Khosrow and Shirin. The reason why Naser al-Din Shah took refuge in his harem for the rest of his life is also considered to be the result of Jeyran's death. Naser al-Din Shah wrote poems about Jeyran in which he praised her beauty and how painful her death was.

In popular culture 
The 2022 Iranian series Jeyran directed by Hassan Fathi is based on her life. Parinaz Izadyar portrays Jeyran in this series.

References 

1831 births
1860 deaths
People from Tehran
Qajar royal consorts
19th-century Iranian women
Tuberculosis deaths in Iran
19th-century deaths from tuberculosis